Frances Terry (1884 - 1965) was an American composer.

A native of East Windsor, Connecticut, Terry undertook composition lessons with Louis Victor Saar and Mr. and Mrs. Edmund Severn, among others. She was active as a piano instructor in New York City and Passaic, New Jersey, later moving to Northampton, Massachusetts. Much of her output consists of works for piano, but she composed a violin sonata and a theme and variations for string quartet as well; the sonata received a prize from the Society for the Publication of American Music in 1931. Stylistically, her work has been described as "Mildly 20th-century with strong expressive qualities and rich harmonies".

References

1884 births
1965 deaths
American women composers
20th-century American composers
20th-century American women musicians
American music educators
American women music educators
20th-century American educators
People from East Windsor, Connecticut
People from Northampton, Massachusetts
Educators from Connecticut
Classical musicians from Connecticut
Educators from Massachusetts
Classical musicians from Massachusetts
20th-century women composers
20th-century American women educators